Bersama Meraih Mimpi ("Reaching Dreams Together") is an Indonesian soap opera, produced by MD Entertainment. It was first aired on MNCTV in November 2013. The main cast is led by members of the pop band Super7.

Cast 
 Bryan Domani as BD
 Ajil Ditto as Ajil
 Bryant Santoso as Bryant
 Raza Adhanzio as Raza
 Karel Susanteo as Karel
 Bagas Super7 as Bagas
 Jose Christian as Jose

Supporting cast 
 Rebecca Kloper
 Bella Anastasya
 Shania Syifa Bella
 Khansa Athaya Edwina Kinasih

Synopsis 

Students at a school with the band Super7, Sonya (Bella Anastasya), Mella (Rebeca), Kiki (Shifa Bella), and Adisty (Khanza), are inspired to form a girl group. They form the band D'Pinks, triggering fierce competition with Super7.

Competition between D'pinks and Super7 increasingly heats up when they become representatives of their school to compete in a singing championship event. Every effort is made by Super7 to deter D'Pinks, but their efforts fail. Through ingenuity and struggle, D'Pinks win the competition.

Competition between D'Pinks and Super7 also occurs in other activities at the school. Mella and Jose always compete in every science competition, and there is an internal problem among parents.

References

External links
  MNCTV

2013 Indonesian television series debuts
Indonesian television soap operas